Trial 4 is a 2020 true crime documentary television series directed by Rémy Burkel. It tells the story of Sean K. Ellis, who was unjustly convicted as a teen in the 1993 killing of Boston police officer John J. Mulligan. Ellis fights for his freedom while exposing systemic racism and corruption within the justice system.

The series was released on Netflix on November 11, 2020.

Episodes

References

External links 

2020 American television series debuts
2020s American documentary television series
Netflix original documentary television series
Documentary television series about crime in the United States
Documentary television series about crime
English-language Netflix original programming